This is a lists the birds of Chennai, the capital city of the Indian state of Tamil Nadu. Over 130 species of birds have been spotted there. The list includes the local Tamil name.


Grebes
Little grebe, mukkulippan

Cormorants
Little cormorant, chinna neer kagam

Darters
Darter, pambu thara

Bitterns, herons and egrets
Grey heron, sambal narai
Purple heron, sen narai
Indian pond heron, kuruttu kokku
Cattle egret, unni kokku
Striated heron, dhosi kokku
Great egret, peria kokku
Black bittern, karunkurugu
Little egret, chinna kokku
Chestnut bittern, sengurugu
Yellow bittern, manal naarai
Intermediate egret, vellai kokku
Black-crowned night heron, erakokku or vakkaa

Storks
Painted stork, manjal mooku naarai or sanguvalai naarai
Asian open-billed stork, nathai kuthi naarai

Ibises and spoonbills
Glossy ibis, arival mookan or anril
Black-headed ibis, vellai arival mookkan or thaalaikothi chondan

Flamingos and pelicans
Greater flamingo, poo narai
Spot-billed pelican

Ducks
Northern pintail, maarkaliyan
Indian spot-billed duck, pulli mookku vathu
Lesser whistling duck, cheezhkai siragi or chilli thaaraa

Hawks, kites and eagles
Shikra, valluru
Eurasian sparrowhawk, kuruvi valluru
Besra, chinna valluru
Black-winged kite, siria karum parundhu or karuntholl parundhu
Brahminy kite, semparundhu or garudan
Black kite, kalla parundhu
Egyptian vulture, manjal thirudi kazhugu
Crested honey buzzard, thaen parundhu
Crested serpent eagle, paambu parundhu
White-bellied sea eagle
White-rumped vulture
Short-toed snake eagle
Booted eagle at Pallikaranai wetland

Falcons
Common kestrel, sivappu valluru

Pheasants and partridges
Grey francolin, kowdhari
Indian peafowl, neela mayil
White-breasted waterhen, kaanang kozhi

Rails, crakes and coots
Common coot, naamak kozhi
Common moorhen, thaazhai kozhi
Grey-headed swamphen, neela thazhai kozhi or neerk kozhi

Jacanas
Pheasant-tailed jacana, neela vaal ilai kozhi
Bronze-winged jacana

Plovers and lapwings
Kentish plover, chinna kottan
Little ringed plover, pattani uppukkothi or sinna kottan
Pacific golden plover, kalporukki uppukkothi or uppukkothi
Red-wattled lapwing, sivappu mookku aalkatti
Yellow-wattled lapwing, manjhal mookku aalkatti

Sandpipers and allies
Common sandpiper, ullan or kottan
Little stint, kosu ullan
Black-tailed godwit, karuvaal mukkan
Ruff, pedhai ullan
Wood sandpiper, pori ullan or vayal ullaan
Common greenshank, pachai kaali or periya kottaan
Marsh sandpiper, chinna pachai kaali
Common redshank, pavazha kaali or sigappukkaal ullan

Snipes and curlew
Common snipe, visirivaal ullan or korai kuthi
Eurasian curlew, peria kottan or kuthiraimalai kottan
Black-winged stilt, pavazhakkaal ullaan
Stone curlew, kankiledi or kannadi aalkaatti

Gulls
Black-headed gull, kadal kaakkai

Terns
Gull-billed tern, parutha alagu aala or kadal kuruvi
river tern, aatru aala

Doves and pigeons
Blue rock pigeon, mada pura
Spotted dove, pulli pura or mani pura
Little brown dove, chinna thavittu pura

Parrots and parakeets
Rose-ringed parakeet, senthaar pynkili or kili

Cuckoos

Greater coucal, shenbagam or kalli kaakka
Red-winged crested cuckoo, sevviragu kondai kuyil or kondai kuyil
Jacobin cuckoo, sudalai kuyil or paruthi kuyil
Asian koel, kokilam or kuyil
Brainfever bird, akka kuyil parundhu kuyil
Blue-faced malkoha, pachai vayan kuyil

Barn owls
Barn owl, koogai andhai or saavu kuruvi

Typical owls
Short-eared owl, kuttai kaadhu aandhai or aandhai
Spotted owlet, pulli aandhai
Eurasian eagle owl, komban aandhai

Nightjars
Indian nightjar, chinna pakki or pakki

Swifts
House swift, nattu uzhavaran
Asian palm swift, panai uzhavaran or uzhavaarakkuruvi

Kingfishers
Small blue kingfisher, siraal meenkothi
Pied kingfisher, karuppu vellai meenkothi
Stork-billed kingfisher, peria alagu meenkothi
Black-capped kingfisher, karunthalai meenkothi
White-throated kingfisher, venthondai meenkothi

Bee-eaters
Green bee-eater, pachai panchuruttan or panchuruttan
Blue-tailed bee-eater, neelawal panchuruttan

Rollers and hoopoe
Indian roller, panangadai
Hoopoe, kondalathi

Barbets
Coppersmith barbet, semmaarbu kukkuruvaan or kalutharuppan

Woodpeckers
Lesser golden-backed woodpecker, ponmudhugu maram kothi

Pitta and larks
Indian pitta, thottakkallan or arumani kuruvi
Oriental skylark, chinna vaanambadi
Ashy-crowned sparrow lark, sambalthalai vaanambadi
Jerdon's bushlark, pudhar vaanambadi

Swallows and martins
Barn swallow, thagaivilaan or thaampaadi

Wagtails and pipits
Paddyfield pipit, pullu porukki
Grey wagtail, kodikkaal vaalatti
yellow wagtail, manjal vaalatti
White-browed wagtail, kulathu kuruvi

Cuckooshrikes
Black-headed cuckooshrike, karunthalai kuyil keechaan
Small minivet, chinna minchittu

Bulbuls
Red-vented bulbul, kondai kuruvi
Red-whiskered bulbul, thondai koluthi
White-browed bulbul, manjal thondaikuruvi
Common iora, maambazha kuruvi

Thrushes and allies
Orange-headed thrush, senthalai poonkuruvi

Prinias
Plain prinia, thinu kuruvi
Ashy prinia, saambal kadhirkuruvi

Cisticolas
Common tailorbird, thaiyal chittu

Acrocephalid warblers
Blyth's reed warbler, kadhirkuruvi

Old World warblers
Yellow-billed babbler, thavittu kuruvi

Old World flycatchers
Indian robin, vannaathi kuruvi
Oriental magpie robin, vannathi kuruvi
Indian paradise flycatcher, vethi vaalkuruvi
Pied bushchat, pudhar chittu

Laughingthrushes
Common babbler, thavittu chilamban
Large grey babbler, periya saambal silamban
Jungle babbler, kaattu silamban

Sunbirds
Purple sunbird, thaen chittu
Loten's sunbird
Purple-rumped sunbird

Old World orioles
Indian golden oriole, maangkuyil

Shrikes
Brown shrike, pazhuppu keechaan
Long-tailed shrike, kattukuruvi or pey kuruvi

Woodshrikes
Common woodshrike, kattu keechaan

Drongos
Black drongo, karichchaan

Woodswallows
Ashy woodswallow, madam puraa

Crows and treepies
Jungle crow, andan kakkai or karun kakkai
House crow, kakkai
Rufous treepie, vaal kakkai

Starlings
Common myna, naahanavaai
Brahminy starling, pappathi naahanavai
Rosy starling, chola kuruvi

Weavers
Streaked weaver, Karungeetru Thookkanam kuruvi
Baya weaver, Thookanaan kuruvi

Munias
Tricoloured munia, thinaikuruvi
Scaly-breasted munia, nellu kuruvi
White-rumped munia, venmudhugu chillai

Sparrows
House sparrow, oor kuruvi
Indian silverbill, nellu kuruvi

References

Chennai
Birds, Chennai
Birds